was a Japanese physician.

Early life and education

Dōsan was born in Kyoto and initially trained to become a monk. However, in his early twenties he began studying medicine under Tashiro Sanki. He enrolled at the Ashikaga School of Medicine, and continued his studies for 17 years.

Career

He published a medical textbook, the Keitekishu, in 1571, and worked as a doctor for many daimyō of the time. He was employed by the shōgun Ashikaga Yoshiteru and treated the Emperor Ōgimachi. The daimyō Dōsan treated included Mōri Motonari, whom Dōsan attended in 1566 during his siege of Toda Castle. When Monotari visited him the following year, Dōsan presented him with nine rules for health, known as the Kyuki. These were:
 Do not be lazy or negligent
 Drink, live and eat modestly
 Enjoy poetry and dancing in moderation
 Rule virtuously
 Be mindful of war, but do not love it
 Listen to all viewpoints
 Note the difference between the lax and the industrious
 Court wise men and eschew extravagance
 Moderation in rule is reflected by moderation in the ruled

That same year, he also visited Matsunaga Hisahide, where he lectured on Chinese texts on sex and the nurturing of life.

Dōsan taught over 3,000 students in what became known as Dōsan-ryu or the Dōsan School. He and his heirs (both natural and adopted) were instrumental in the spread of the Goseihō school of medical thought in Japan, which stemmed from Chinese systems of medicine.

References

16th-century Japanese physicians
1507 births
1594 deaths